Harry Josephine Giles (born 1986) is an English writer and poet who previously lived on Orkney. In 2022, they won the Arthur C. Clarke Award for their novel Deep Wheel Orcadia.

References 

Writers from Orkney
English poets
1986 births
British science fiction writers
Living people
Scots-language poets